Paul J. Steinbroner was born March 18, 1949, in Los Angeles.  In 1983, he founded CNS Productions, a publishing and distribution company specializing in topics related to  addiction, neuropharmacology, and brain chemistry. He is the publisher of Uppers, Downers, All Arounders, a textbook on the neurochemistry and neuropharmacology of psychoactive drugs. Having previously produced informational and scientific documentaries, Steinbroner formed TouchPoint Productions  to create a series of documentaries on transformational healing. Collectively known as Called From Darkness, the five part series examines willingness and spiritual awakening from five different cultural perspectives.

CNS Productions
After multiple assignments as a freelance script writer and a television-news editor, Paul moved to Los Angeles to attend the Production Program at the American Film Institute.  After this stint in Hollywood, Paul formed CNS Productions as a vehicle to produce and distribute films that addressed the unmet needs of people with substance-abuse disorders. Based on the experiences of Darryl Inaba, Pharm.D, while Director of Treatment at the Haight Ashbury Detoxification, Rehabilitation, and Aftercare Clinic, CNS Productions' films found a national audience.

Publications
CNS Productions has published the following on the subject of neuropharmacology:

Uppers, Downers, All Arounders

Based on the many interviews with clients from the expanding film catalog, the onset of the crack epidemic, and the multicultural needs of patients, William Cohen and Darryl Inaba wrote the textbook Uppers, Downers, All Arounders, originally published by CNS Productions in 1989 and now in its 8th edition.

Uppers, Downers, All Arounders is Dr. Inaba's  and William Cohen's way of explaining the physiological and pharmacological responses that the body has to psychoactive drugs, those chemicals that can pass through the blood brain barrier and produce a mental effect in the central nervous system. Thus, uppers stimulate, downers depress, and psychedelic drugs have a variety of effects on the neurotransmitters.

Called From Darkness

Called from Darkness is a multi-part series of documentaries on overcoming addiction through community and connection, produced and directed by Paul Steinbroner (TouchPoint Productions). All of these films examine how overcoming addiction includes a spiritual experience as noted by Carl Jung.

Home Boy Joy Ride is a 30-minute documentary on Fr. Greg Boyle and his work in founding Homeboy Industries which is the largest gang-intervention program in the United States;
Soul Sanctuary: Beit T'Shuvah is a synagogue, kibbutz, and treatment center where people find a life and purpose thanks to the efforts of founders Harriet Rosetto and Rabbi Mark Merkowitz;
Stand Down: Too many traumatized veterans end up on the street after a life of serving their country. Issues of mental health, substance and abuse and homelessness rob them of a future, but Veterans Village of San Diego, California (VVSD) provides a hand up, not a hand out. Their annual "Stand Down" event provides a template for delivering services to veterans and has provided an event that has been duplicated by over 300 cities.
Journeys on the Red Road refers to the way in which Native Americans come into connection and community through ceremonial rituals. Produced in the Pacific Northwest with Salish tribes, this is an homage to the strength and determination of indigenous people to overcome historical trauma, racism, and substance abuse by committing to work with a canoe family on their annual Canoe Journey event.
JustUs is the story of how a community besieged by heroin and methamphetamine exposure looks to their Spanish-Catholic and Pueblo culture to find the vestiges of ceremony and spirituality to ward off a massive overdose epidemic which threatens to destroy a unique group of people that inhabit Northern New Mexico. The film includes Richard Rohr, OFM of the Center for Action and Contemplation(CAC) in Albuquerque, New Mexico.

Filmography
Paul Steinbroner was the producer and (where indicated with an asterisk) director of the following films:
"Psychoactive" - 1976				
"Uppers, Downers, All Arounders" - 1984 		
Haight Asbbury Cocaine Film, 1985			
"A Matter of Balance" - 1986					
Haight Ashbury Crack Film - 1987 				
"From Opium to Heroin" - 1988				
Haight Ashbury Training Series volumes 1-5 - 1992-94
"Marijuana: the Mirror that Magnifies"* - 1995
"Methamphetamine: The Rush to Crash"* - 1996					
"In and Out of Control: Emotional, Physical & Sexual Violence"* - 1997
"Compulsive Gambling & Recovery" - 1997
"Roots of Addiction" - 1998
"Heroin: From Pleasure to Pain"* - 1999
"Alcohol and Its Effects" - 2000
"Sports and Drugs" - 2001
"Compulsive Gambling: Signs & Symptoms"* - 2001
"The Other Gamblers: Seniors & Women"* - 2001
"Psychoactive: Club Drugs & Inhalants"* - 2002
"Cocaine & Crack: A Craving for More"* - 2003
"Prescription & OTC Abuse"* - 2004
"Co-Occurring Disorders: Mental Health & Drugs" - 2005
"Medical Consequences of Addiction"* -   2005
"Marijuana: Neurochemistry & Physiology"* - 2006
"Methamphetamine: Neurochemistry and Recovery"* - 2007
"Neurochemistry of Relapse and Recovery"* - 2008
10-part series: "Use, Abuse and Addiction"* - 2009
"Drug and Behavioral Addictions: Roots of Addiction"
"The Neurochemistry of the Roots of Addiction"* - 2011
"Reflections in a Rearview Mirror: How I Got My DUI, Costs & Losses, Physiology, Levels of Use, and How My Life Changed for the Better" (5 parts) - 2013
"Beyond Opiates" - 2013
"Cannabinyzed:  The Mental and Physical Effects of Marijuana" - 2016
"Soul Sanctuary" - 2019
"Stand Down" - 2019 
"Home Boy Joy Ride" - 2020
"Journeys on the Red Road" - 2020
"JustUs" - 2021

References

External links
CNS Productions website
Called From Darkness website

1949 births
Living people
American documentary film directors
People from Wenatchee, Washington
San Francisco State University alumni
Film directors from Washington (state)